The Grizzly King: A Romance of the Wild is a 1916 novel by American author James Oliver Curwood.  It was the inspiration for the director Jean-Jacques Annaud's 1988 film L'Ours, known in North America as The Bear.

External links

1916 American novels
American novels adapted into films
Grizzly bears in popular culture
Books about bears
Novels set in Canada
Novels by James Oliver Curwood